is a Japanese former football player and current manager of Matsumoto Yamaga.

Club career
Shimoda was born in Toshima, Tokyo on February 10, 1967. After three years at Takashima High School, he opted for a trip away from Japan. He studied in Brazil, played in the youth ranks of Santos, where he met Kazuyoshi Miura and César Sampaio. He returned to Japan and played in the old Japan Soccer League, but he retired at only 27 years old.

Managerial career
Shimoda tried to have a career in the coaching world, managing the youth side at Kyoto Purple Sanga, but he was also the men behind the return of Miura to Japan in 1999, when the striker opted to sign for Sanga from Dinamo Zagreb. He was as well behind some FC Tokyo's football operations concerning the acquisition of foreign players in the early 2000s. After getting a coach patent, he managed YSCC Yokohama for a couple of months. He also managed the reserves of JEF United Chiba, but in the end Japan Football Association asked him in 2009 to be in the Technical Committee through a direct request from their chairman, Hiromi Hara. Shimoda accepted and he stayed in charge as a scout for seven years, also briefly managing the Japan U-23 national team in 2013.

In 2017, he was also the reserve head coach at Sint-Truidense, in Belgium. He went back to Japan in 2018, when he accepted the offer of Renofa Yamaguchi FC to be the next head coach.

In June of 2021, he became the manager of Omiya Ardija. On 26 May 2022, He was fired from manager after worst performance at J2 League after Matchweek 18.

On 5 December 2022, Shimoda announcement manager of Matsumoto Yamaga from 2023 replace Nanami after expiration contract.

Managerial statistics
Update; start of the 2023 season

References

External links

Profile at Renofa Yamaguchi FC

1967 births
Living people
Association football people from Tokyo
Japanese footballers
Japan Soccer League players
Shonan Bellmare players
Kyoto Sanga FC players
Tokyo Musashino United FC players
Japanese football managers
J2 League managers
J3 League managers
YSCC Yokohama managers
Renofa Yamaguchi FC managers
Omiya Ardija managers
Matsumoto Yamaga FC managers
Association football defenders